Caenia dimidiata is a species of net-winged beetle in the family Lycidae. It is found in North America.

References

 Green, John Wagener (1952). "The Lycidae of the United States and Canada. IV. The tribe Calopterini (Coleoptera)". Transactions of the American Entomological Society, vol. 78, no. 1, 1–19.

Further reading

 Arnett, R. H. Jr., M. C. Thomas, P. E. Skelley and J. H. Frank. (eds.). (21 June 2002). American Beetles, Volume II: Polyphaga: Scarabaeoidea through Curculionoidea. CRC Press LLC, Boca Raton, Florida .
 Arnett, Ross H. (2000). American Insects: A Handbook of the Insects of America North of Mexico. CRC Press.
 Richard E. White. (1983). Peterson Field Guides: Beetles. Houghton Mifflin Company.

External links

 NCBI Taxonomy Browser, Caenia dimidiata

Lycidae